The 2017 Virginia 529 College Savings 250 was the 25th stock car race of the 2017 NASCAR Xfinity Series season and the 37th iteration of the event. The race was held on Friday, September 8, 2017, in Richmond, Virginia, at Richmond International Raceway, a 0.75 miles (1.21 km) D-shaped oval. The race took the scheduled 250 laps to complete. In the final stages of the race, Brad Keselowski, driving for Team Penske, would pull away from the field to win his 36th career NASCAR Xfinity Series win and his second and final win of the season. To fill out the podium, Kyle Busch, driving for Joe Gibbs Racing, and Ty Dillon, driving for Richard Childress Racing, would finish second and third, respectively.

Background 

Richmond Raceway (RR), formerly known as Richmond International Raceway (RIR), is a 3/4-mile (1.2 km), D-shaped, asphalt race track located just outside Richmond, Virginia in Henrico County. It hosts the NASCAR Cup Series, the NASCAR Xfinity Series, NASCAR Camping World Truck Series and the IndyCar series. Known as "America's premier short track", it formerly hosted two USAC sprint car races.

Entry list 

 (R) denotes rookie driver.
 (i) denotes driver who is ineligible for series driver points.

Practice 
The only one hour and 55-minute practice session was held on Friday, September 8, at 8:00 AM EST.

Qualifying 
Qualifying was held on Friday, September 8, at 4:15 PM EST. Since Richmond Raceway is under 2 miles (3.2 km) in length, the qualifying system was a multi-car system that included three rounds. The first round was 15 minutes, where every driver would be able to set a lap within the 15 minutes. Then, the second round would consist of the fastest 24 cars in Round 1, and drivers would have 10 minutes to set a lap. Round 3 consisted of the fastest 12 drivers from Round 2, and the drivers would have 5 minutes to set a time. Whoever was fastest in Round 3 would win the pole.

Morgan Shepherd was the only driver to fail to qualify.

Full qualifying results 

*Time not available.

Race results 
Stage 1 Laps: 75

Stage 2 Laps: 75

Stage 3 Laps: 100

Standings after the race 

Drivers' Championship standings

Note: Only the first 12 positions are included for the driver standings.

References 

2017 NASCAR Xfinity Series
NASCAR races at Richmond Raceway
September 2017 sports events in the United States
2017 in sports in Virginia